Jedforest is an historic forest in the Scottish Borders, that has been heavily wooded in the past. It is close to Jed Water and the town of Jedburgh, from which it takes its name.

The forest is home to the widespreading Capon tree. It is an oak tree in Jedburgh near to another famous oak, 'King o' the Woods' and thought to be in excess of 500 years old. It has a girth of 17 feet, measured four feet from the ground.

References

See also
Jed-Forest Rugby Football Club

Environment of the Scottish Borders
Forests and woodlands of Scotland
History of the Scottish Borders
Jedburgh